Anja Hitzler (born 16 February 1983 in Welzheim) is an athlete from Germany.  She is a professional soldier and competes in archery.

Hitzler represented Germany at the 2004 Summer Olympics.  She placed 23rd in the women's individual ranking round with a 72-arrow score of 632.  In the first round of elimination, she faced 42nd-ranked Damla Gunay of Turkey.  Hitzler defeated Damla, winning 163–152 in the 18-arrow match to advance to the round of 32.  In that round, she faced Wu Hui Ju of Chinese Taipei, losing to the 10th-ranked archer in a 9–8 tie-breaker after matching Wu 156–156 in the regulation 18 arrows.  Hitzler finished 21st in women's individual archery. Hitzler was also a member of the 7th-place German team in the women's team archery competition.

During the 2008 Summer Olympics in Beijing, she was ranked 33rd in the women's individual archery preliminaries with a score of 629. In the first round she defeated Sophie Dodemont with 107–106. She went on to lose to top ranked Park Sung-hyun in the 1/16 elimination round, losing the match with 112–107.

References

1983 births
Living people
German female archers
Olympic archers of Germany
Archers at the 2004 Summer Olympics
Archers at the 2008 Summer Olympics